Miet Smet (born 5 April 1943) is a Belgian politician for the Christian Democratic and Flemish party (CD&V).

Career
In 1988, Smet became the president of the European Centre for Workers' Questions, a position which she held till 1995.

Career in national politics
Smet was the founder (1973), and first president (until 1982) of the Christian People's Party political women's organisation, Vrouw en Maatschappij (Woman and Society).

She was elected to the Belgian Chamber of People's Representatives in 1978. In 1985, she became State Secretary of Environmental Affairs, and negotiated an Equal Opportunities portfolio. While Smet's competencies cover all aspects of social emancipation, she focused on violence against women, women's economic position and their participation in decision-making. When Miet Smet became Minister of Labour and Employment in 1991, she kept the Equal Opportunities portfolio.

Member of the European Parliament
When she was offered first place in the CD&V list for the European elections in 1999 instead of Wilfried Martens, Martens, at the instigation of then-wife Ilse Schouteden, refused to run at all.

Miet Smet was a Member of the European Parliament from 1999 to 2004.

She became a Minister of State in 2002, and has been a member of the Flemish Parliament since 2004, and a Belgian senator since 2007.

In 2009, Smet was elected president of the Association of European Parliamentarians with Africa (AWEPA), taking over from former president Dr. Jan Nico Scholten.

Personal life
On 27 September 2008, Miet married fellow CD&V politician and former Belgian Prime Minister Wilfried Martens.  After the death of Martens' first wife, Lieve Verschroeven, the marriage was confirmed in the Catholic Church on 27 April 2013.

Other activities
 Wilfried Martens Centre for European Studies, Member of the Academic Council

Honours 
 2002 : Minister of state by Royal Decree.
 2004 : Grand Officer  in the Order of Leopold.
 2002 : Dame Grand Cross in the Order of Merit of the Federal Republic of Germany.

References

External links

 Archives of Miet Smet in ODIS - Online Database for Intermediary Structures

1943 births
Living people
Christian Democratic and Flemish politicians
Flemish politicians 
Members of the Belgian Federal Parliament
Belgian Ministers of State
Grand Crosses 1st class of the Order of Merit of the Federal Republic of Germany
Christian Democratic and Flemish MEPs
MEPs for Belgium 1999–2004
20th-century women MEPs for Belgium
21st-century women MEPs for Belgium
Belgian Roman Catholics
Women government ministers of Belgium